Peace on You was Roger McGuinn's second full-length solo album, released in 1974. The album peaked at number 92 in the US in October 1974.

Track listing
All tracks composed by Roger McGuinn and Jacques Levy except where otherwise noted.

Side one
 "Peace On You" (Charlie Rich) – 4:01
 "Without You" – 4:07
 "Going To The Country" (Donnie Dacus) – 3:17
 "(Please Not) One More Time" (Al Kooper) – 3:23
 "Same Old Sound" (McGuinn) – 3:30

Side two
 "Do What You Want To Do" (Dacus) – 3:00
 "Together" – 3:45
 "Better Change" (Dan Fogelberg) – 3:00
 "Gate Of Horn" – 2:45
 "The Lady" – 4:16

Bonus track on 2004 Sundazed CD reissue
 "Rock & Roll Time" (Kris Kristofferson, McGuinn, Bobby Neuwirth) - 3:18

Personnel
Roger McGuinn - vocals, guitar, bass
Dan Fogelberg - guitar, vocals
Al Kooper - guitar, piano, clavinet, arrangements, conductor
Jorge Calderón - vocals
Brian Russell - vocals
Tim Coulter - vocals
Donnie Dacus - guitar, vocals
Brenda Gordon - vocals
Paul "Harry" Harris - keyboards
Brooks Hunnicutt - vocals
Howard Kaylan - vocals
Russ Kunkel - drums, percussion
Al Perkins - steel guitar
Leland Sklar - bass
Paul Stallworth - vocals
Tommy Tedesco - flamenco guitar
Mark Volman - vocals
William McLeish Smith - vocals
Gwendolyn Edwards - vocals
Lee Kiefer - arranger & conductor

References

Roger McGuinn albums
1974 albums
Columbia Records albums